No. 166 Squadron RAF was a Royal Air Force squadron that formed just after the end of World War I. It was the first and one of only three to be equipped with the Handley Page V/1500 heavy bomber.

History
The squadron was formed on 13 June 1918 at RAF Bircham Newton as the first squadron to be equipped with the Handley Page V/1500 heavy bomber. Designed for the long-range bombing role and particularly for raids on Berlin the squadron worked up with training on long-range navigation. It had three aircraft ready for the first operation but with the Armistice was not flown operationally. It continued to train but the RAF had decided to use the Vickers Vimy in the long-range bombing role so the squadron was disbanded.

The squadron was re-formed on 1 November 1936 at RAF Boscombe Down from B Flight of 97 Squadron with the Handley Page Heyford III heavy bomber. Within a few months it had moved into the newly opened RAF Leconfield in Yorkshire. The Heyfords were eventually replaced with the Armstrong Whitworth Whitley in June 1939. The squadron was not used for operations but became a training squadron to prepare crews for front-line service. With the start of the war the squadron moved to RAF Abingdon and it was disbanded on 6 April 1940 when it was absorbed into No. 10 Operational Training Unit.

142 Sqn and 150 Sqn  were sent to North Africa but had enough surplus crews and equipment left behind at RAF Kirmington that they were re-formed on 27 January 1943 as 166 Squadron equipped with the Vickers Wellington. It did not wait to see action and two-days after forming, on 29 January, the squadron was part of raid on Lorient. It flew regularly night sorties as part of No. 1 Group Bomber Command and converted to the Avro Lancaster in September 1943. At the start of 1945 with a slow down in operation the squadron flew both day and night sorties but with the end of the war the squadron was disbanded, still at Kirmington, on 18 November 1945.

Aircraft operated

Notes

References

External links

166